Knack Roeselare is a Belgian professional men's volleyball club based in Roeselare. They compete in the Euro Millions Volley League and the CEV Champions League.

Honours

Domestic
 Belgian Championship
Winners (13): 1988–89, 1999–2000, 2004–05, 2005–06, 2006–07, 2009–10, 2012–13, 2013–14, 2014–15, 2015–16, 2016–17, 2020–21, 2021–22

 Belgian Cup
Winners (15): 1988–89, 1989–90, 1993–94, 1999–2000, 2004–05, 2005–06, 2010–11, 2012–13, 2015–16, 2016–17, 2017–18, 2018–19, 2019–20, 2020–21, 2022–23

 Belgian SuperCup
Winners (10): 2000–01, 2004–05, 2005–06, 2007–08, 2010–11, 2013–14, 2014–15, 2018–19, 2019–20, 2022–23

International
 CEV Cup
Winners (1): 2001–02

 CEV Challenge Cup
Silver (2): 1997–98, 1998–99

Team
As of 2022–23 season

References

External links
 Official website 
 Team profile at Volleybox.net

Belgian volleyball clubs
Sport in Roeselare
Volleyball clubs established in 1964
1964 establishments in Belgium